John Crysler  (July 24, 1770 – January 18, 1852) was a businessman and political figure in Upper Canada.

He was born in Schoharie, New York in 1770, the son of German immigrants; the family name was originally spelled Krausler or Kruessler. His father served in the King's Royal Regiment of New York during the American Revolution under Sir John Johnson; and John Crysler was a drummer boy with Butler's Rangers. They both settled in Williamsburgh Township after the war. Crysler operated a tavern, cut timber to supply the Royal Navy with masts and built gristmills and sawmills. In 1804, he was elected to the Legislative Assembly of Upper Canada representing Dundas. In 1806, he was appointed justice of the peace in the Eastern District. He served with the Dundas County Militia during the War of 1812, becoming captain. The Battle of Crysler's Farm was fought on his property and his farm sustained heavy damage during the battle. He represented Dundas in the Legislative Assembly from 1812 to 1820 and from 1825 to 1828. In 1825, some of his employees were jailed for cutting timber on clergy reserves. He became lieutenant-colonel in command of the Dundas Militia in 1838 and led his regiment into combat at the Battle of the Windmill.

He died in Finch Township in 1852. The village of Crysler was named after him. His son John Pliny served in the Legislative Assembly of the Province of Canada. The former location of his farm was submerged when the St. Lawrence Seaway was built; a monument erected on the site of the battle was moved to Upper Canada Village.

External links 
Biography at the Dictionary of Canadian Biography Online

Members of the Legislative Assembly of Upper Canada
United Empire Loyalists
American emigrants to pre-Confederation Ontario
Canadian people of German descent
American people of German descent
People from Schoharie, New York
1770 births
1852 deaths